Las Moras Mountain, is a summit in the Texas Hill Country four miles northeast of Brackettville in Kinney County, Texas. It stands at an elevation of 1676 feet.

References

Landforms of Kinney County, Texas
Mountains of Texas